Solo is an EP by DC Talk consisting primarily of the band members' solo efforts with the exception of a live-performance cover of U2's "40", which is the last recording made by the band before going on hiatus. "Extreme Days", was written and recorded for the film Extreme Days and a different mix was released on Momentum released later in the year.

The album won 2002 Grammy Award for Best Rock Gospel Album.

Track listing

Music videos
Extreme Days

References

DC Talk albums
TobyMac albums
2001 EPs
ForeFront Records EPs
Grammy Award for Best Rock Gospel Album